The Wyoming Rule is a proposal to increase the size of the United States House of Representatives so that the standard representative-to-population ratio would be that of the smallest state, which is currently Wyoming. Under Article One of the United States Constitution, each state is guaranteed at least one representative. If the disparity between the population of the most and least populous states continues to grow, the disproportionality of the U.S. House of Representatives will continue to increase unless the body, whose size has been fixed at 435 since 1929 (except for a brief period from 1959 to 1963), is expanded.

A total of 547 seats would have been required to implement the Wyoming Rule based on the 2010 United States census results. However, the decade leading up to the 2020 United States census saw Wyoming's population increase at a lower rate than that of the rest of the United States; as a result, the required House size to implement the Wyoming Rule will increase to 573. Under the Wyoming Rule, California would gain the most seats with seventeen more members than it will have after the next reapportionment.

While expanding the House would reduce some disparities in district size, it would not necessarily result in the smallest and largest districts being proportionally closer. After the 1990 United States census and with a House size of 435, the largest district (Montana) had 799,065 residents, 76.2% larger than the smallest district (Wyoming) with 453,588 residents. The Wyoming Rule would have given a House size of 545 in 1990 if the former method of seat apportionment had been used. With that size, the largest district (North Dakota) would have had 638,800 residents, 91.8% larger than the smallest districts (Delaware's two districts) at approximately 333,084 residents each, due to Delaware having enough population to be split in two but North Dakota falling just on the other side of the threshold.

Legal and constitutional basis for the current House of Representatives size
The current size of the House was set by the Reapportionment Act of 1929. This law would need to be repealed and replaced in order to change the number of congressional members, which would require a majority of both houses of Congress to approve it.

From a constitutional standpoint, the only restriction on House size is that there can be at most one representative per thirty thousand people. Therefore, the Wyoming Rule would be constitutional as long as no state had two or more representatives with a population below 60,000.

Under the 2020 U.S. census
The chart set out below identifies the number of House seats that would be given to the respective states if the Wyoming Rule were to be implemented using the population numbers from the 2020 United States census. 

South Dakota with its two seats and an average of 443,885 people per seat would have the most seats per capita. North Dakota's lone seat (779,702 people per seat) would have the fewest seats per capita. This gives a ratio of 1 to 1.75654 between greatest and smallest number of persons per seat. (By comparison, it will be 1 to 1.82574 for the lone seat of Delaware (990,837 per seat) and Montana's two seats (542,704 per seat).)

States with only one seat which fall short of getting an extra seat in the House include North Dakota, Alaska, and Vermont (and by definition, Wyoming). On the other hand, states with only one seat which manage to secure an extra seat include Delaware and South Dakota.

Historical House sizes
The following table describes how the House of Representatives would have looked historically, had the Wyoming Rule been adopted as part of the Reapportionment Act of 1929, instead of fixing the size at 435 representatives.

The smallest state in each census since 1930 were:
 Nevada (censuses 1930–1950)
 Alaska (censuses 1960–1980)
 Wyoming (censuses 1990–2020)

See also
Apportionment
Congressional Apportionment Amendment
List of proposed amendments to the United States Constitution
List of U.S. states and territories by population
Simpson's paradox

References

Electoral reform in the United States
United States House of Representatives
United States Electoral College
United States congressional districts
Voting theory